The U.S. Mid-Amateur, often called the Mid-Am for short, is the leading annual golf tournament in the United States for post-college amateur golfers, organized by the USGA.

The Mid-Am was the first new USGA championship in 19 years, since the U.S. Senior Women's Amateur was added in 1962.

Qualifications for the Mid-Am are similar to those for the U.S. Amateur, except for the following:
Competitors must be at least 25 years old as of the opening day of the main tournament.
Competitors must have a USGA handicap index of 3.4 or lower, as opposed to 2.4 or lower for the U.S. Amateur.

The U.S. Mid-Amateur does not have a gender restriction, but there has never been a female champion.  The USGA's analogous event for women only is the U.S. Women's Mid-Amateur, first played in 1987.

The USGA specifically intended the Mid-Am as a championship for post-college golfers who were not pursuing golf as a career, as virtually all golfers who pursue a professional career decide to do so no later than their early twenties. This was most likely a response to the fact that less than half of all U.S. Amateur qualifiers are 25 or older, and most older golfers found themselves disadvantaged in competing against college golfers who typically play much more often. 

Like the U.S. Amateur, the Mid-Am consists of two days of stroke play, with the leading 64 competitors then playing a knockout competition held at match play to decide the champion. The profile of Mid-Am champions, with respect to age, is somewhat similar to that of U.S. Amateur champions before World War II. In that era, more top-level golfers chose to remain amateur, and the average age of U.S. Amateur Champions was higher.

While the list of winners is considerably less illustrious than that of the U.S. Amateur, one notable winner was Jay Sigel, a three-time winner of this event and a two-time U.S. Amateur champion who went on to play the Champions Tour. The winner receives an automatic invitation to play in the Masters Tournament and the U.S. Open (starting in 2018).

Winners

* Match was conceded due to injury

Multiple winners
4 wins: Nathan Smith
3 wins: Jay Sigel
2 wins: Tim Jackson, Spider Miller, Jim Stuart, Stewart Hagestad

Future sites

References

External links
Official site (most information is in the archive sections)

Amateur golf tournaments in the United States
Mid-Amateur Golf Championship